Ministry for Internal Affairs of Mari El (Mari: Марий Эл Республикысе Элкӧргӧ паша министерстве;In Russian: Министерство внутренних дел по Республике Марий Эл) is the main law enforcement organ in Mari El in Russia. Subordinated directly to the Russian Interior Ministry and the President of Mari El.

External links
Official Website in Russian
Official Website in Mari language
Traffic Police in Mari El

Politics of Mari El
Mari El
Mari El